Tintypes is a musical revue conceived by Mary Kyte with Mel Marvin and Gary Pearle. The score, featuring works by George M. Cohan, John Philip Sousa, Joseph E. Howard, Scott Joplin, and Victor Herbert, among others, is a blend of the patriotic songs, romantic tunes, and ragtime popular during the era.

The revue originally was produced by the Arena Stage in Washington, D.C. An off-Broadway production opened on April 17, 1980 at the York Theatre, where it ran for 137 performances.

After eleven previews, the Broadway production, directed by Pearle and choreographed by Kyte, opened on October 23, 1980 at the John Golden Theatre, where it ran for 93 performances. The cast was  Lynne Thigpen, Jerry Zaks, Trey Wilson, Carolyn Mignini, and Mary Catherine Wright.

An original cast recording was released by DRG, and the play was staged for television in 1982 with the original principals.

Cast
 Carolyn Mignini
 Lynne Thigpen
 Trey Wilson
 Mary Catherine Wright
 Jerry Zaks

Songs

Act I     
 Ragtime Nightingale
 The Yankee Doodle Boy
 Ta-ra-ra Boom-de-ay
 I Don't Care
 Come Take a Trip in My Airship
 Kentucky Babe
 A Hot Time in the Old Town Tonight
 Stars and Stripes Forever
 Electricity
 El Capitan
 Pastime Rag
 Meet Me in St. Louis
 Solace
 Waltz Me Around Again Willie
 Wabash Cannonball
 In My Merry Oldsmobile
 Wayfaring Stranger
 Sometimes I Feel Like a Motherless Child
 Aye, Lye, Lyu Lye
 I'll Take You Home Again, Kathleen
 America the Beautiful
 Wait for the Wagon
 What It Takes to Make Me Love You, You've Got It
 The Maiden With the Dreamy Eyes
 If I Were on the Stage (Kiss Me Again)
 Shortnin' Bread
 Nobody
 Elite Syncopations
 I'm Goin' to Live Anyhow, 'Til I Die

Act II     
 The Ragtime Dance
 I Want What I Want When I Want It
 It's Delightful to Be Married
 Fifty-Fifty
 American Beauty
 Then I'd Be Satisfied With Life
 Narcissus
 Jonah Man
 When It's All Goin' Out and Nothin' Comin' In
 We Shall Not Be Moved
 Hello! Ma Baby
 Teddy Da Roose
 A Bird in a Gilded Cage
 Won't You Come Home Bill Bailey
 She's Gettin' More Like the White Folks Every Day
 You're a Grand Old Flag
 The Yankee Doodle Boy (Reprise)
 Toyland
 Bethena
 Smiles

Awards and nominations

Original Broadway production

External links
 
 Tintypes at the Music Theatre International website

1980 musicals
Broadway musicals